Monz is a surname. Notable people with this surname include:

 Anna Monz (born 1989), German handball player
 Mauro Monz (born 1974), American football player